At least three ships of the Imperial Russian Navy, Soviet Navy, or Russian Navy have been named Alexander Nevsky after 
the Russian saint Alexander Nevsky.

 , a screw frigate launched in 1861
 , a  launched in 1951
 , a  launched in 2010

See also
 , launched in 1916. Saw service with the Royal Navy as HMS Alexander before returning to Russia and entering into service with the Soviet Union as Lenin.

Citations

References
 

Russian Navy ship names